The 2009–10 All-Ireland Senior Club Hurling Championship was the 40th staging of Ireland's premier inter-county club hurling competition since its establishment by the Gaelic Athletic Association in 1970–71. A total of 15 teams competed in the championship, with Ballyhale Shamrocks unseating the two-time defending champions Portumna by 1–19 to 0–17 in the final at Croke Park, Dublin.  The championship began on 11 October 2009 and concluded on 17 March 2010.

Pre-championship

The build-up to the opening of the championship was dominated by Portumna and the possibility that they would become the first club to win three All-Ireland titles in-a-row, and a remarkable fourth in five championship seasons. Having secured their fifth county title since 2003, Portumna were only two games away from immortality.  The club had already come to be regarded as possibly the greatest club side of all time.  Winning an elusive three-in-a-row would close the argument on club hurling's greatest team.

Ballyhale Shamrocks were regarded as the primary challengers to Portumna's stranglehold on the championship.  They entered the competition having captured their fourth county title and were hoping to become the first club to win five All-Ireland titles.  Similarly, they were hoping to exact revenge on Portumna who dished out a 5–11 to 1–16 trouncing in the previous year's semi-final.

The championship

Participating counties

Format

The 2009–10 club championship was run on a provincial basis as usual.  It was a knockout tournament with pairings drawn at random in the respective provinces – there were no seeds.

Each match was played as a single leg. If a match was drawn there was a replay.  If that match ended in a draw a period of extra time was played, however, if both sides were still level at the end of extra time another replay would take place.

Leinster Championship

Quarter-finals: (2 matches) These were two lone matches between the first four teams drawn from the province of Leinster.

Semi-finals: (2 matches) The winners of the two quarter-finals joined the other two Munster teams to make up the semi-final pairings.

Final: (1 match) The winners of the two semi-finals contested this game.

Munster Championship

Quarter-final: (1 match) This was a single match between the first two teams drawn from the province of Munster.

Semi-finals: (2 matches) The winner of the lone quarter-final joined the other three Munster teams to make up the semi-final pairings.

Final: (1 match) The winners of the two semi-finals contested this game.

Ulster Championship

Semi-finals: (1 match) This was a single match between the first two teams drawn from the province of Ulster.

Final: (1 match) The winner of the lone semi-final joined another Ulster team, who received a bye to the final, to make up the final pairings.

All-Ireland Series

Semi-finals: (2 matches) The four provincial champions contested these games.

Final: (1 match) The two semi-final winners contested the final.

Fixtures

Ulster Senior Club Hurling Championship

Leinster Senior Club Hurling Championship

Munster Senior Club Hurling Championship

All-Ireland Senior Club Hurling Championship

Championship statistics

Scoring

First goal of the championship: James Coyle for Ballycran against Kevin Lynch's (Ulster semi-final)
Last goal of the championship: David Hoyne for Ballyhale Shamrocks against Portumna (All-Ireland final)
Widest winning margin: 12 points
Ballyhale Shamrocks 4–18 – 0–18 Ballyboden St. Enda's (Leinster quarter-final)
Portumna 2–18 – 0–12 Dunloy (All-Ireland semi-final)
Most goals by one team in a match: 4
Ballyhale Shamrocks 4–18 – 0–18 Ballyboden St. Enda's (Leinster quarter-final)

Top scorers

Season

Single game

Referees
The following referees were used during the championship:

Stadia
The following stadia were used during the championship:

References

2009 in hurling
2010 in hurling
All-Ireland Senior Club Hurling Championship